Onnum Mindathe (Without Saying anything) is a 2014 Indian Malayalam family-drama movie, produced by Shafeer Sait and directed by Sugeeth. The film stars Jayaram, Meera Jasmine, Manoj K. Jayan in the lead roles while Devi Ajith, Lalu Alex, Baby Anikha, Dharmajan Bolgatty, Joy Mathew, Valsala Menon, Ambika Mohan and Jayaraj Warrier playing supporting roles.

Cast

 Jayaram as Sachidanandan
 Meera Jasmine as Shyama
 Manoj K. Jayan as Jose
 Sarayu as Rose
 Devi Ajith
 Shritha Sivadas
 Anikha Surendran
 Dharmajan Bolgatty as Vinod
 Joy Mathew
 Chinnu Kuruvila as Sara George
 Valsala Menon
 Ambika Mohan
 Jayaraj Warrier
 Lalu Alex

Music

 "Thennalin"
Singer: Sangeetha Srinkanth
 "Onnu Mindathe"
Singer: K. J. Yesudas
 "Ariyampadathu"
Singer: Madhu Balakrishnan
 "Onnu Mindathe" (Male)
Singer: K. J. Yesudas

References

External links 
 

2014 films
2010s Malayalam-language films
Films shot in Thrissur
Films directed by Sugeeth